Richard Cummings may refer to:

Richard Cummings (actor) (1858–1938), American silent film actor
Richard Cummings Jr., American TV actor
Richard D. Cummings, American biochemist